The Wikampama (Wik Ompom) were an indigenous Australian people of Cape York Peninsula in northern Queensland.

Country
The Wikampama are said to have had  of land around the Middle Archer River, extending northwards to the Watson River.

Alternative names
 Kokiala (toponym for a creek)
 Kokala.

Notes

Citations

Sources

Aboriginal peoples of Queensland